Tatarani may refer to several places in Romania:

Tătărani, a commune in Dâmboviţa County
Tătărăni, a commune in Vaslui County
Tătărani, a village in Bărcănești Commune, Prahova County
Tătărani, a village in Băbeni Town, Vâlcea County
Tătărăni, a village in Dănești Commune, Vaslui County